The Hôtel de Condé was the main Paris seat of the princes of Condé, a cadet branch of the Bourbons, from 1612 to 1764/70.

The hôtel gave its name to the present rue de Condé, on which its forecourt faced. The Théâtre de l'Odéon was constructed in the former gardens of the hôtel particulier in 1779–82.

The Hôtel de Condé comprised almost all the terrain in the 6th arrondissement of Paris that is now enclosed within rue de Condé, Vaugirard and Monsieur-Le-Prince and the crossroads of the Odéon. The property was first built upon, in a suburban environment beyond the city walls of Philippe Auguste, by Antoine de Corbie, premier président of the Parlement de Paris. In the reign of Charles IX the property belonged to the naturalized Florentine banker Albert de Gondi, a favourite of the king. In the ruin of Philippe-Emmanuel de Gondi, father of the Cardinal de Retz, his hôtel was seized.

In 1610, Marie de Médicis gave it to Henri II, Prince of Condé in part recompense for his agreeing to marry Charlotte Marguerite de Montmorency, a former mistress of Henri IV. The  hôtel was largely reconstructed by its new owner.

The Hôtel de Condé formed a vast ensemble of structures, with wings separated by narrow interior courtyards, with awkward intrusions and party walls; however, the main corps de logis opened upon an extensive parterre garden in the French manner, separated from the cour d'honneur by a fine wrought-iron railing. A series of three terraces descended to rue de Vaugirard, facing the Palais du Luxembourg. The garden was so spacious that, when it was necessary to close the Luxembourg Garden to the public, the gates of the princely residence could be opened, and the crowd could be admitted without the least encumbrance.

Germain Brice, in Description nouvelle de la ville de Paris (1707) gave an admiring description of the furnishing of the Hôtel de Condé:
"The ceiling of the bedchamber and of the cabinet of Mme la Princesse have been painted by de Sève... As for furniture, it is difficult to see any in any other palace richer or in greater quantity. One finds here as well pictures by masters of the first rank, among others a Baptism of Our Lord by Albano... extraordinary tapestries and hardstone carvings more than in any other place. A numerous library is conserved here as well, composed of curious books and the rarest of hand-drawn maps."

Here, where his mother Marie Éléonore de Maillé de Carman had a suite of rooms, in her place as lady companion to the Princess de Condé, was born the Marquis de Sade.

Louis Joseph, Prince of Condé, his mistress, the Princesse of Monaco, and members of the Condé family moved into the Palais Bourbon in 1764, and Louis XV bought the property and its gardens in 1770. On 26 March 1770, an order in council authorized the execution of the theater project intended for the Comédie-Française, designed by Charles De Wailly and Marie-Joseph Peyre in the terraces of the garden of the hôtel. Previously,  Peyre, in his Oeuvres d'architecture, 1765, illustrated a project, whether executed or not, for a symmetrical staircase in two curving flights placed in the vestibule of the "Hôtel de Condé"; he had exhibited it to the Académie in 1763; it may have been intended for the Prince at the Palais Bourbon.

In 1778, Louis XVI  offered his brother, the Count of Provence, the Luxembourg and the hôtel de Condé. In 1779, the division of the site into building lots sparked a vast construction project. comparable to that undertaken by the Duke of Chartres at the Palais-Royal. Streets were driven through the terrain, including rue de l'Odéon, (at first called rue du Théâtre-Français) the first street in Paris provided with sidewalks, which was opened through the middle of the former Hôtel de Condé at the same time that the new Théâtre-Français opened (1782), after 1807 called the Théâtre de l'Odéon.

Notes

Bibliography
 Guides Bleu: Paris, Hachette, 1988
 Dominique Leborgne, Saint-Germain des Prés et son faubourg, Parigramme, 2005

History of Paris
Condé
Former buildings and structures in Paris